The Rose River is an  river in the U.S. state of Virginia. Rising on the south face of Hawksbill Mountain, the highest point in Shenandoah National Park, the river flows southeast to its junction near Syria, Virginia, with the Robinson River, a tributary of the Rapidan River and part of the Rappahannock River watershed.

See also
List of rivers of Virginia

References

USGS Hydrologic Unit Map - State of Virginia (1974)

Rivers of Virginia
Tributaries of the Rappahannock River
Rivers of Madison County, Virginia